Antonio V. Liberti may refer to:

Estadio Monumental Antonio Vespucio Liberti - the stadium of Club Atlético River Plate, a football club in Buenos Aires, Argentina
Antonio Vespucio Liberti - a former president of Club Atlético River Plate, and the namesake of the above stadium